Aleksandrs Fertovs (born 16 June 1987) is a Latvian footballer who plays as a midfielder for FK RFS and the Latvia national football team. Fertovs's nickname in Latvia is Kaķis (Cat).

Club career

Early career
Aleksandrs Fertovs started playing football in 1998, at the age of 11. As a youth player he played for his local club JFC Skonto, being a member of the Skonto Riga academy. In 2007, he was taken to the Latvian Higher League club JFK Olimps. Even though Olimps finished the championship in the last place of the table, Fertovs showed good performance, playing 13 matches during the season. In 2008, he was offered to join Skonto Riga first team. The competition for places in the starting line-up was stiff, and the youngster found himself playing just 1 match for the club. Later he was loaned out and yet again joined JFK Olimps, who despite finishing last the previous season, had secured themselves a place in the Latvian Higher League for the upcoming one. Fertovs scored 3 goals in 17 matches during his loan spell at Olimps.

Skonto Riga
Fertovs returned to Skonto Riga before the 2009 Latvian Higher League season. He gained a place in the starting line-up, playing 22 league matches in his full debut season at the club. In the 2010 Latvian Higher League season Fertovs became champion of Latvia under the manager Aleksandrs Starkovs. He scored twice in 23 league matches. During the next two seasons Fertovs played 52 league matches, scoring 3 goals. In 2011 Fertovs won the Baltic League with Skonto, but in 2012 he helped his team win the Latvian Cup. In 2011 Aleksandrs was included in both - Latvian Football Federation and sportacentrs.com teams of the tournament. In 2012, he repeated it, being included in the LFF team of the year. The 2013 season saw Fertovs play 23 league matches and score 8 goals, being included in the LFF team of the year for the third consecutive year in a row, with Skonto finishing as the runners-up in the league.

Sevastopol
On 26 January 2014, Fertovs signed a contract with the Ukrainian Premier League club FC Sevastopol for 2.5 years. He scored his first league goal on 4 April 2014, helping Sevastopol beat Vorskla Poltava 1–0. On 23 April 2014 Fertovs scored twice, helping Sevastopol beat Metalurh Zaporizhya 5–0. He was later included in the football.ua and ua-football.com teams of the round. All in all he played 9 Premier League matches for the club, scoring 3 goals. On 27 June 2014 it was announced that the club had been dissolved due to the Russian aggression in the region and all players were granted free agents' status.

International career
From 2007 to 2009 Fertovs was a member of Latvia national under-21 football team. He made his debut for Latvia at full international level on 15 November 2009 in a friendly match against Honduras, coming on as a substitute in the 80th minute, replacing Genādijs Soloņicins. As of May 2014, Fertovs has played 26 international matches with his first goal yet to come.

Honours

Club
Skonto Riga
 Latvian Higher League: 2010
 Baltic League: 2011
 Latvian Cup: 2012

International
 Baltic Cup: 2012, 2014

References

External links
 
 
 
 

1987 births
Living people
Latvian people of Russian descent
Footballers from Riga
Association football midfielders
Latvian footballers
Latvia international footballers
Skonto FC players
JFK Olimps players
FC Sevastopol players
Latvian expatriate footballers
Expatriate footballers in Ukraine
Latvian expatriate sportspeople in Ukraine
Ekstraklasa players
Korona Kielce players
Expatriate footballers in Poland
Latvian expatriate sportspeople in Poland
FK RFS players
Latvian Higher League players